Kumiko (くみこ, クミコ) is a feminine Japanese given name.

Possible writings
Kumiko can be written using different kanji and can mean:
久美子, "forever, beauty, child"
空見子, "sky, see, child"
公美子, "public, beauty, child"
來未子, "come, not, child"
功美子, "success, beauty child"
The name can also be written in hiragana or katakana.

People
Kumiko Asō (久美子), a Japanese actress
Kumiko Akiyoshi (久美子), a Japanese actress
Kumiko Ogura (久美子), a Japanese female badminton player
Kumiko Nakano (公美子), a Japanese actress
Kumiko Goto (久美子), a Japanese model, actress and wife of Jean Alesi
Kumiko Takeda (久美子), a Japanese actress and model
Kumiko Hayashi (久美子), a Japanese politician
Kumiko Aihara (久美子), a Japanese politician
Kumiko Nishihara (久美子, born 1965), a Japanese voice actress
Kumiko Watanabe (久美子, born 1965), a Japanese actress and voice actress
Kumiko Nakane (中根久美子), a Japanese voice actress
, Japanese animator and character designer
, Japanese singer
, Japanese writer
Kumiko Okamoto (久美子), a Japanese retired female tennis player
Kumiko Sato (久美子), a Japanese figure skating coach
Kumiko Ikeda (久美子), a Japanese long jumper
Kumiko Koiwai (久美子), a former Japanese figure skater
, Japanese cross-country skier

Fictional characters
Kumiko (character), a character portrayed by Tamlyn Tomita in The Karate Kid Part II (1986) and Cobra Kai (2021)
Kumiko Yamaguchi (久美子), the main character in the manga, anime, and television drama series Gokusen
Kumiko Okada (久美子), a character in Haruki Murakami's novel The Wind-Up Bird Chronicle
Kumiko Ōmae (久美子), the protagonist of the novel series Sound! Euphonium
Kumiko Tanaka?, the little daughter of Mr. Tanaka in Memoirs of a Geisha
Kumiko, title character in the 2014 American drama film Kumiko, the Treasure Hunter
Kumiko "The Bullet", pilot of one of the playable machines in F-Zero: Maximum Velocity
Kumiko Albertson, a recurring character in The Simpsons

See also
 4454 Kumiko, main-belt Asteroid
 Kumikō, a game of kōdō
 kumiko, the pieces of lattice work in shoji

Japanese feminine given names